Tarmo Jallai (30 January 1979) is a retired Estonian track and field athlete who competed in the 2004 Summer Olympic Games in Athens where he finished in 37th place in the men's 110 metres hurdles event.

Born in Tartu, Estonia, Jallai attended schools in his native country before studying at Texas A&M University–Kingsville in the United States where he competed for the school on the men's track and field team, the Javelinas from 2003 to 2006.
In 2006, Jallai competed at the Xalapa Gala Banamex Veracruz and broke the Estonian record for the 110 metres hurdles in 13.62 seconds - a record that is still unbroken by a fellow countryman.  He has also competed in the 23rd Universiade in 2005, the 19th European Athletics Championships in 2006, the IAAF World Championships in Athletics in 2007 and the 2007 World Championships in Athletics.

Tarmo Jallai currently resides in his hometown of Tartu.

References

1979 births
Living people
Estonian male hurdlers
Olympic athletes of Estonia
Athletes (track and field) at the 2004 Summer Olympics
Sportspeople from Tartu
University of Tartu alumni
Texas A&M University alumni
World Athletics Championships athletes for Estonia
Competitors at the 2005 Summer Universiade